"To Be Human" is a song recorded by Australian singer Sia featuring English singer Labrinth for the soundtrack to the 2017 superhero film Wonder Woman. It was released as a single on 25 May 2017 by WaterTower Music.

Composition
"To Be Human" is a pop ballad; some critics believed it reflects the film's core relationship between Gal Gadot's Wonder Woman and Chris Pine's Steve Trevor. Lyrically, the song expresses a love that can conquer all odds. It is the only non-instrumental song on the soundtrack album.

Critical reception
In Rolling Stone, Brittany Spanos thought with the "cinematic" single, Sia "creates a sweeping, epic musical moment". Lauren Tom for Billboard wrote that "Sia's powerful song reflects the film’s underlying message", noting the singer "channels her inner Wonder Woman". Megan Davies in Digital Spy opined the song is a "powerful new anthem". Randall Colburn of Consequence of Sound wrote: "The swelling, anthemic track, is a rousing one, bound to underscore a tender moment between Gal Gadot and co-star Chris Pine".

Charts

References

External links

2010s ballads
2017 singles
2017 songs
DC Extended Universe music
Labrinth songs
Love themes
Pop ballads
Sia (musician) songs
Song recordings produced by Rick Nowels
Songs written by Florence Welch
Songs written by Rick Nowels
Songs written for films
WaterTower Music singles
Wonder Woman in other media
Wonder Woman (film series)